Loudima (can also be written as Ludima) is a town in the southern part of the Republic of Congo, in the Loudima District of the Bouenza Department.  The town has about 18,000 inhabitants.

Transport 

It is served by a station on the national railway system, and is to the east of the junction of the branch line to Mbinda.

See also 

 Railway stations in Congo

References 

Bouenza Department
Populated places in the Republic of the Congo